Alexander Shakalov (born 26 March 1982 in Dnipropetrovsk, Ukrainian SSR) is a Ukrainian ice dancer.

Career 
In his early career, Shakalov competed with Viktoria Polzykina and Julia Grigorenko for Ukraine. From 2003 to 2007, he competed with Olga Akimova for Uzbekistan. They were the 2004-2005 Uzbekistani national champions. In 2009, Shakalov teamed up with Siobhan Heekin-Canedy and resumed competing for his native country. The couple were coached by Galit Chait and Natalia Dubova and split after the 2011 World Championships. He retired from competitive figure skating after the 2011 World Championships. He is now working as a coach.

Programs

With Heekin-Canedy

With Akimova

With Grigorenko

With Polzykina

Competitive highlights

With Heekin-Canedy for Ukraine

With Teremtsova for Ukraine

With Akimova for Uzbekistan

With Grigorenko for Ukraine

With Polzykina for Ukraine

References

External links 

 
 
 
 

Sportspeople from Dnipro
Ukrainian male ice dancers
Uzbekistani male ice dancers
1982 births
Living people